Villemomble is a commune in the eastern suburbs of Paris, France.

Heraldry
{{Blazon-arms
|img1=Blason_Villemomble_93.svg
|legend1=Arms of Villemomble
|text=The arms of Villemomble are blazoned :Per pale argent and gules semy of castles Or, a lion gules surmounted by an escarbuncle fleury Or.
|motto=villa non una sed mille (not one house but a thousand)}}

Transport
Villemomble is served by Le Raincy – Villemomble – Montfermeil station on Paris RER line E.

Demography

Education
There are seven public preschools/nurseries (maternelles''): Foch, Galliéni, François Mauriac, Montgolfier, Pasteur, Prévert, Saint-Exupéry. There are five public elementary schools: Foch I, Foch II, élémentaire d’application François Coppée Lamartine, Leclerc, and Saint-Exupéry.

There are two public junior high schools, Collège Jean de Beaumont and Collège Pasteur, and two public senior high schools/sixth-form colleges, Lycée Georges Clemenceau and Lycée professionnel Blaise Pascal.

Private schools include École maternelle Saint-Alexis, École élémentaire Sainte-Julienne, And the junior and senior high school of Institution Saint-Louis Blanche de Castille (collège Saint-Louis and lycée Blanche de Castille).

Twin towns – sister cities

Villemomble is twinned with:
 Droylsden, England, United Kingdom
 Hardtberg (Bonn), Germany
 Portimão, Portugal

See also
Communes of the Seine-Saint-Denis department

References

External links

Official website (in French)

Communes of Seine-Saint-Denis